James F. Denevan (born 27 June 1961 in Santa Clara County, California) is an American artist who creates temporary land art. He is also the founder of Outstanding in the Field, a traveling farm dinner series.

Biography 
The passion for sand drawing (and land art) came to Jim Denevan when surfing. He realized how the beaches were empty canvas, and felt the appeal the fill the void.

In March 2010, Denevan was commissioned by The Anthropologist to create a large scale drawing on Lake Baikal. The drawing is the world's largest single artwork. A documentary of the journey and artwork called Art Hard was released in 2011. The short version of the film premiered at the Hamptons International Film Festival and was also accepted at the Carmel Art and Film Festival, DocNYC Film Festival, Milwaukee Short Film Festival and ION International Film Festival.

Work 
Jim Denevan works with natural materials to create massive scale drawings in sand, ice, and soil. His sculptures are not placed in the landscape, rather, the landscape is the means of their creation. His process goes beyond drawing and implies a spiritual land-finding process.

Jim Denevan uses a stick and a rake to draw on sand. His creations usually last a few hours before being washed away by the tides. Aerial photography or video is needed to comprehend the final work.

Jim Denevan's most recent notable work was commissioned by the clothing brand Stüssy. The work of art is featured on a T-shirt, highlighting the features of the northern California coast.
"For the launch of Stüssy’s Summer 2020 collection, Artist and California local Jim Denevan, drew an iconic Stüssy curly “S” in the golden sand of Northern California. Monumental in scale, precise in execution, but fleeting like a live performance. Here today, gone tomorrow."

Jim Denevan has also previously been commissioned for the following works of art:

2022 "Angle of Repose", Desert X AlUla, AlUla.

2015 Clarks Boots, "The Desert Boot," Jean Dry Lake, Jean, Nevada

2015 Zazen Bear, Studio Matter, "Zen Garden," New York, NY

2014 Earth to Echo, Relativity Media, Water Drawing, Lucerne Dry Lake, California

2011 Amstel, "The Amstel Surfari," Mundaka, Spain

2011 Movistar Summer Experience 2011, Argentina

2011 Hyundai, "Make An Impression," Campaign, Australia

2010 Anthropologie, Drawing on Lake Baikal, Siberia

2008 Absolut Vodka, "In An Absolut World" Campaign, "In an Absolut World Cities Farm" Rockefeller Center, New York City, NY

2006 Land Rover/Range Rover, "Designed for the Extraordinary," television, print and billboard campaign, Point Conception, CA.

Jim Denevan's work has been featured at museums across the country. Vancouver Sculpture Biennale in 2010, and the Yerba Buena Center for the Arts in 2005, have held live performances of Jim drawing his art.
Jim's art has been displayed at art collections like the MoMA PS1, the Laguna Art Museum, the Museum of Arts and Design, the Parrish Art Museum, and the Peabody Essex Museum.

References

External links 
 Jim Denevan
 Outstanding in the Field
 CBS News Sunday Morning – Jim Denevan – Original Air Date: 2008-01-20

1961 births
Living people
Artists from California
Land artists
Public art
American conceptual artists